Abida gittenbergeri is a species of air-breathing land snail, a terrestrial pulmonate gastropod mollusc in the family Chondrinidae.

Geographic distribution
A. gittenbergeri is restricted to a small area consisting of the Garrotxa and Alt Empordà regions in Spain as well as the adjacent Coustouges region in France.

Ecology
The species can be found in soils with limestone substrate, under rocks and leaf litter and within crevices in rock.

References

Chondrinidae
Gastropods of Europe
Gastropods described in 2000